Peter Spencer was a Sky News political correspondent from 1991 to 2013.  He now works as a freelance print, radio and television journalist, and author.

Before taking on his Sky role, Spencer worked as a newspaper journalist and for British Satellite Broadcasting.

Journalism career
Spencer's career began as a reporter on his local newspaper in Essex and later for a Fleet Street news agency. He has also worked as a reporter and a sub-editor for three national titles and a London evening paper.

During the 1970s and 1980's he was a Westminster based political correspondent for IRN and LBC.

In 1990 he joined BSB as producer of the satirical programme Left, Right, and Centre. Upon the merger of Sky and BSB, he became a political correspondent with Sky News. He held this position until 2013, often appearing at weekends. 

Spencer left Sky News in 2013.  He now writes a weekly political column in the online men's lifestyle magazine Malestrom.  

His first novel, Pitfalls of Power, was published in October 2020. In June 2014 he had a collection of short stories published: The X Tractor: Cornwall's Culling Plan.

Personal life
Spencer is a grandfather and has been married more than once. His mother is half French and his father half Irish.

References

External links 

 Pitfalls of Power on Amazon or on Troubador
The X Tractor: Cornwall's Culling Plan on Amazon

Living people
English television journalists
Sky News newsreaders and journalists
Year of birth missing (living people)
English people of Irish descent
English people of French descent